It Could Happen to You is a 1939 American comedy film directed by Alfred L. Werker and written by Lou Breslow and Allen Rivkin. The film stars Stuart Erwin, Gloria Stuart, Raymond Walburn, Douglas Fowley, June Gale and Clarence Kolb. The film was released on June 8, 1939, by 20th Century Fox.

Plot
A beautiful girl gets murdered and ad man Mackinley Winslow gets arrested, now his wife Doris has to solve the crime and prove her husband's innocence.

Cast       
Stuart Erwin as Mackinley Winslow
Gloria Stuart as Doris Winslow
Raymond Walburn as J. Hadden Quigley
Douglas Fowley as Freddie Barlow
June Gale as Agnes Barlow
Clarence Kolb as Alfred Wiman
Paul Hurst as Sandy
Richard Lane as District Attorney Gibson
Robert Greig as Pedley

References

External links 
 

1939 films
20th Century Fox films
American comedy films
1939 comedy films
Films directed by Alfred L. Werker
American black-and-white films
1930s English-language films
1930s American films